Asmus and Clark was an architectural firm based in Nashville, Tennessee.  Asmus and Norton was a predecessor firm.

It was a partnership of Christian A. Asmus and Richard R. Clark, formerly of Pittsburgh, Pennsylvania, formed in 1919, with offices at 634 Stahlman Building, in Nashville.

At least two of its works are listed on the National Register of Historic Places (NRHP) for their architecture.

Works of the firm and its predecessor include:
Home for Aged Masons (1913), Ben Allen Ln. and R.S. Glass Blvd. Nashville, TN (Asmus and Norton), NRHP-listed
Grand Lodge of Tennessee (1925), 100 7th Ave. N., Nashville (Asmus & Clark). Classical Revival-style.
Bennie-Dillon Building (1925-26), 702 Church St., Nashville (Asmus & Clark), NRHP-listed  Renaissance Revival.
St. Thomas' Hospital, Nashville (Asmus & Clark)

References

Companies based in Nashville, Tennessee
Architecture firms based in Tennessee
American companies established in 1919
Defunct companies based in Tennessee
Defunct architecture firms of the United States
Year of disestablishment missing